Old Man of the Mountain is a former rock formation and New Hampshire landmark.

Old Man of the Mountain may also refer to:

People
 Old Man of the Mountain (Assassin), referring to
 Hassan-i Sabbah (c. 1050–1124), founder of the Nizari Isma'ili state and its military group known as the Order of Assassins
 Rashid ad-Din Sinan (c. 1134–1193), Nizari leader in Syria
 Brian Timmis (1899–1971), Canadian football player

Other uses
 The Old Man of the Mountain (film), a 1933 Betty Boop cartoon
 Tetraneuris grandiflora, an alpine sunflower in North America
 Oreocereus, a genus of cacti in South America

See also
 Mountain Man (disambiguation)